Gilda Z. Jacobs (born April 1, 1949) was a Democratic member of the Michigan Senate, representing the 14th district from 2003 through 2010. The mostly suburban district is in southeastern Oakland County, and includes the cities of Farmington Hills, Huntington Woods, Southfield, and Oak Park. Jacobs was a member of the Michigan House of Representatives from 1999 to 2002.

She currently serves as president and CEO of the Michigan League for Public Policy. In 2019 she was inducted into the Michigan Women's Hall of Fame.

Early life
Senator Jacobs graduated from the University of Michigan, received her bachelor's degree in science with a distinction in education in 1970 and a master's degree in behavioral sciences in education in 1971. She was a special education teacher in the Madison School District until the late 1980s.

Political career
Jacobs was the first woman elected to the Huntington Woods City Commission, serving from 1981 to 1994. She was the mayor pro tem of Huntington Woods in 1993–1994, and served as Oakland County Commissioner from 1995 to 1998. She was elected to the Michigan State House of Representatives in 1998, where she served for two terms. She represented the 35th district, which includes most of the city of Southfield. While in the House, she made history by being the first female floor leader in either House of the legislature. 

In 2002, she ran for the open state senate seat being vacated by Senator Gary Peters. She won in a landslide in the heavily Democratic 14th district. She served as the chair of the Senate Democratic Caucus. She was the vice-chair of the Economic Development, Small Business & Regulatory Reform Committee and the Families and Human Services Committee, and also served on Government Operations and Health Policy Committees. There was early speculation that Jacobs might challenge Rep. Joe Knollenberg, but she decided against it and endorsed her predecessor in the State Senate, Gary Peters. Due to Michigan's term limits, Jacobs was not eligible to run for re-election in 2010, and she was succeeded by Vincent Gregory, a Democrat from Southfield.

Personal life
Jacobs and her husband, John, have one living daughter. Another daughter, Rachel, was killed in the 2015 Philadelphia train derailment. In 2003, the Democratic Leadership Council named her one of the 100 New Democrats to Watch, a list of up-and-coming Democratic politicians. She is a member of Triangle Foundation's Board of Advisors.

Electoral history
2006 Election for the Michigan State Senate - 14th District

2002 Election for the Michigan State Senate - 14th District

2000 Election for the Michigan State House - 35th District

1998 Election for the Michigan State House - 35th District

References

External links
Project Vote Smart - Senator Gilda Z. Jacobs (MI) profile
Follow the Money - Gilda Z. Jacobs
2006 2004 2002 Senate campaign contributions
2002 2000 1998 House campaign contributions
Gilda Jacobs' profile, Michigan Senate Democratic Caucus; accessed November 6, 2014.
SD14 Incumbent Gilda Z. Jacobs (D-Huntington Woods) profile, MichiganLiberal.com; accessed November 6, 2014. 
Sen. Jacobs: It's Time to Lift Michigan's Ban on Stem Cell Research, BloggingforMichigan.com; accessed November 6, 2014.

1949 births
Living people
Democratic Party Michigan state senators
Democratic Party members of the Michigan House of Representatives
University of Michigan alumni
Jewish American state legislators in Michigan
Women state legislators in Michigan
People from Huntington Woods, Michigan
Place of birth missing (living people)
21st-century American Jews
21st-century American women